The Mittlerer Erzgebirgskreis is a former district in Saxony, Germany. It was bounded by (from the west and clockwise) the districts of Annaberg, Stollberg, the district-free city Chemnitz, and the district Freiberg. To the south it borders the Czech Republic (the Karlovy Vary Region).

History 
The district was formed in 1994 by merging the two previous districts Marienberg and Zschopau. On 1 August 2008 it was merged into the new district Erzgebirgskreis.

Geography 
The district was located in the Ore Mountains (German Erzgebirge). The highest elevation is the 891 m high Hirtstein, the lowest elevation with 305 m is located in Witzschdorf. 40% of the area is covered by forests.

Coat of arms

Towns and municipalities

External links 
Official website (German)
tourist website (German)

History of the Ore Mountains